This article lists power stations in the Republic of the Congo.

Thermal

Hydroelectric

See also 

 List of power stations in Africa
 List of largest power stations in the world

References

External links

Congo, Republic of the
Power stations